Do over may refer to:

 Mulligan (games), in games and sports
 Do-Over, 30 Rock television series episode
 Do Over (Transformers), a Transformers comic book set in the Shattered Glass continuity
 Do Over, Television show from 2002 
 The Do-Over, 2016 action comedy web film

See also
 Do Overs and Second Chances, 2010 music album by Go Radio
 Redo
 Dover (disambiguation)